The 2016 World Financial Group Continental Cup of Curling was held from January 14 to 17 at the Orleans Arena in Paradise, Nevada. This marked the second edition of the Continental Cup to be held outside of Canada. The Continental Cup featured team events, mixed doubles events, and skins competitions, with most points available in the skins competitions. TSN broadcast the event, as it had in previous years.

The total attendance for the event was 62,498, the highest in Cup history (as of 2017). Team North America collected CAD$52,000 winners cheque and CAD$13,000 skins bonus. Team World collected CAD$26,000 losers cheque.

Competition format
This edition of the Continental Cup used a similar format as that of the previous year, with the main difference being the elimination of the singles event, which was replaced by an additional mixed doubles event. Out of the sixty total points available, a majority of points were needed to win the cup. The mixed doubles, and team games were worth one point each, with ties being worth one half point each to both teams. The skins games were worth a total of five points. Six mixed doubles and six singles games were played, along with eighteen team games and six skins games.

Teams
The teams were selected from the top teams in each region. Six teams from each region competed against each other in the competition. Four teams from Canada earned the right to represent Team North America by virtue of winning certain events, namely the Canada Cup of Curling and the Canadian National Championships (the Brier and the Tournament of Hearts). Two teams from the United States, namely the winners of the United States National Championships, were chosen to represent North America, and the teams representing Team World were selected by the World Curling Federation.

The teams in the table below were announced as representatives of their respective regions.
For Team North America, the teams participating included Canada Cup champions Kevin Koe and Rachel Homan, Tournament of Hearts champion Jennifer Jones, Brier champion Pat Simmons, and United States national champions Erika Brown and John Shuster. For Team World, the teams participating include reigning women's world champion Alina Pätz,  Olympic bronze medallist Eve Muirhead, two-time world champion Niklas Edin, Japanese women's national champion Ayumi Ogasawara, Chinese men's national champion Zang Jialiang, and world champion Thomas Ulsrud.

Events
All times listed are in Pacific Standard Time (UTC−8). The draws for Thursday, Friday, and Saturday were released on Wednesday night, and the draws for Sunday will be released on Saturday afternoon.

Thursday, January 14

Draw 1
Team
8:30 am

Draw 2
Mixed doubles
1:00 pm

Draw 3
Team
6:30 pm

Friday, January 15

Draw 4
Team
8:30 am

Draw 5
Mixed doubles
1:00 pm

Draw 6
Team
6:30 pm

Saturday, January 16

Draw 7
Mixed doubles
9:00 am

After the first four ends, the players on each team were replaced with new players.

Draw 8
Team
1:00 pm

Draw 9
Team
6:30 pm

Sunday, January 17

Draw 10
Skins
1:00 pm

Draw 11
Skins
6:30 pm

References

External links

2016
2016 in curling
International curling competitions hosted by the United States
Continental Cup of Curling 2016
2016 in sports in Nevada
Curling in Nevada
January 2016 sports events in the United States